John L. McKinley was an American football coach. He served as the head football coach at the State College for Colored Students—now known as Delaware State University—in Dover, Delaware.

McKinley graduated from Armstrong High School—now known as Friendship Armstrong Academy—in Washington, D.C. He then attended Virginia Union University for a year before transferring to New York University (NYU), from which he graduated in 1931 with a Bachelor of Science in physical education. He was the first African-American to receive a B.S. degree from the Department of Physical Education at NYU.

McKinley coached boys and girls at the Abyssinian Baptist Church in Harlem in 1928–29, leading the boys basketball and track teams and girls basketball team to city championships.

Head coaching record

References

Year of birth missing
Year of death missing
Delaware State Hornets football coaches
New York University alumni
Virginia Union University alumni
Coaches of American football from Washington, D.C.
African-American coaches of American football
African-American basketball coaches
20th-century African-American sportspeople